HMS Rooke was a shore establishment of the British Armed Forces in Gibraltar from 1946 to 1990.

Located on Queensway near King's Bastion, the base replaced the Royal Navy Gibraltar Squadron's HMS Cormorant and became a Joint Service Base. The Royal Navy closed the base and paid it off in 1996 and it became headquarters for the Gibraltar Defence Police until their move to the HM Naval Base. The base was named after Admiral George Rooke who led the Anglo-Dutch Capture of Gibraltar in 1704.

The Gibraltar Squadron's headquarters is located further south at PJOB Gibraltar.

The entire complex has since been demolished.

British Forces Gibraltar
Military history of Gibraltar
Royal Navy bases outside the United Kingdom